The Mechanical Licensing Collective (MLC) is a nonprofit organisation established under the Music Modernization Act of 2018. It was created to issue blanket mechanical licences for qualified streaming services in the United States, such as Spotify, Apple Music, Amazon Music, and Tidal.

History 
In 2020, The MLC announced that four music data companies are joining its Data Quality Initiative (DQI), including: Blokur, Exactuals, Music Data Services, and TuneRegistry. This move was made to ensure the accuracy of their musical works data in its current database.

As of January 2021, the MLC began paying royalties to rights owners. In October 2022, it was reported that the MLC had paid almost $700 million in blanket royalties to songwriters and publishers.

Funding 
The digital services that use the MLC have a legal obligation to spend $33.5 million on their start-up costs and $28.5 million on their first-year operating costs.

Function 
To resolve the issue of music creators not getting paid for their work, the MLC built a publicly accessible musical works database and portal that creators and music publishers can use to submit and maintain their musical works data. This is so that when their music is played on streaming services, the generated royalties are collected from digital service providers and distributed to the appropriate songwriters, composers, lyricists, and music publishers.

References

External links 

 

Music licensing organizations
Music publishing